Janko Tipsarević was the defending champion but chose not to defend his title.

Marcel Granollers won the title after defeating Enrique López Pérez 4–6, 6–2, 6–0 in the final.

Seeds

Draw

Finals

Top half

Bottom half

References
Main Draw
Qualifying Draw

Singles
Bangkok Challenger II - Singles
 in Thai tennis